The Skitzos were a Canadian punk rock band from Calgary, Alberta, Canada. They performed around Western Canada from 2005 until 2008.  Members included: Aaron Arseneau (bass), Josh Boley (drums), Mark McLennan (guitar) and Ryder Thalheimer (vocals).

History
The Skitzos formed in north east Calgary in 2004. Original guitarist Geoff Reynard quit just after releasing their independent demo 'Modern Youth'; Mark McLennan then took over guitar, and months later The Skitzos began preparing to release what would become the Faster Louder Better! EP. Despite working really hard, The Skitzos never achieved mainstream success.

Discography
 Modern Youth EP (2005)
 Faster Louder Better! EP (2007, Longshot Music).

References

Musical groups established in 2004
Musical groups disestablished in 2008
Musical groups from Calgary
Canadian punk rock groups
2004 establishments in Alberta
2008 disestablishments in Alberta